This is a list of villages in the Charkhi Dadri district of the Indian state of Haryana sorted by tehsil. Population data is from the 2011 Census of India.

Badhra tehsil

Charkhi Dadri tehsil

References

Lists of villages in India
 
Districts of India-related lists
Haryana-related lists
Lists of villages in Haryana